Gerald Jatzek (born 23 January 1956 in Vienna) is an Austrian author, composer, mail artist and musician. He writes in German and English and has published books for children and adults, short stories, plays for radio, and essays. His books have been translated into Korean and Turkish, his poems have appeared in anthologies and literature  papers in Germany, Switzerland, Liechtenstein, Italy, Slovakia, the Czech Republic, Croatia, the Netherlands, the UK, and the USA. 

1980 he was awarded the Liechtenstein Price. 2001 he got the Austrian State Prize for Children's Poetry.

Books 

 Der Lixelhix children's book, 1986
 Gegentöne - Kritische Lieder, rebellischer Rock, nonfiction, with Philipp Maurer, ÖGB-Verlag Vienna 1988
 Der Tag des Riesen, Picture Book Text, graphic: Annegert Fuchshuber, Ellermann Verlag, Munic 1989 
 Widerrede - Die Kabarettung Österreichs, nonfiction, with Philipp Maurer, ÖGB-Verlag, Vienna 1990
 Dina und der Zauberzwerg, children's book, Jungbrunnen Verlag, Vienna 1990, 
 Der freche Pelikan, Picture Book Text, graphic: Ursula Kirchberg, Ellermann Verlag, Munic 1991, 
 Isidor, der kleine Drache, Picture Book Text, graphic: Rosemarie P. Sohn, Ellermann Verlag, Munic 1991, 
 Mein Freund, der Riesenriese, children's book, Neuer Breitschopf Verlag, Vienna 1992, 
 Ich bin, wer ich will! children's book, with Christian Orou, Neuer Breitschopf Verlag, Wien 1992, 
 Freddie Flink in Schilda, children's book, with Beppo Beyerl, Neuer Breitschopf Verlag, Wien 1993, 
 Der Rückwärtstiger, children's book: short stories, St. Gabriel, Mödling 1995,  (Paperback: dtv 1998)
 Wienerisch - das andere Deutsch, with Beppo Beyerl and Klaus Hirtner, Rump Verlag, Lingen/Ems 1995, 
 Kuno, das Schulgespenst, children's book, 1996; new edition: Obelisk Verlag, Innsbruck 2018, 
 Kuno aus der Tasche, children's book: Erzählung plus Rätsel, Noten und Basteltipps, Gabriel, Vienna 1998, 
 Lexikon der nervigsten Dinge und ätzendsten Typen. Satires, with Beppo Beyerl, Munic 1998
 Valentin und Wanda, children's book, with Beppo Beyerl, Residenz Verlag, St. Pölten 2003
 Wie kommt der Esel auf die Brücke, nonfiction, with Hermann Schlösser, Molden Verlag, Vienna 2008, 
 Die rote Gitarre, children's book, illustrated by Moidi Kretschmann, G&G-Verlag, Vienna 2010, .
 Der Hase hüpft in hübschen Hosen, children's book with Audio-CD, illustrated by Lisa Manneh, G&G-Verlag, Vienna 2010, .
 Rabauken-Reime, poetrybook, illustrated by Andrea Steffen, Residenz Verlag, St. Pölten 2011, .
 Der Schnüffelbold, children's book, Obelisk-Verlag, Innsbruck 2012, 
 Der Hund ist tot. Grätzelgeschichten aus 24 Wiener Bezirken, with Beppo Beyerl and Manfred Chobot, Löcker Verlag, Vienna 2012, 
 Die Lieder riechen nach Thymian. Reisegedichte von Afghanistan bis Zypern (poetry)', Verlag Berger, Horn 2014, 
 Podium Porträt, poetrybook, Podium, Neulengbach and Vienna 2017,

Songs 
(with Claudia Hainschink:) Das Lied hinter dem Lied. Dialektgedichte und Chansontexte. Cassette, IDI, Vienna 1979

with Thomas Raber 
Der Tiger und der Jäger, Zeit, Ein Kind ist keine Maschine  on the CD "Liederfundkiste - Juchhe der erste Schnee", RATOM-Edition, Vienna 2011
Abrakadabra, Hänsel und Gretel auf dem Klo on the CD "Liederfundkiste - In Kinderstadt", RATOM-Edition, Vienna 2012
Tsching Tschang Tschungon the CD "Liederfundkiste - Eine Schule für Coole", RATOM-Edition, Vienna 2012

Editorship 
 Gedichte nach 1984. Poetry from Austria, by Gerald Jatzek and Hansjörg Zauner, Edition Ahnungen, Vienna 1985, 
 Erleichterung beim Zungezeigen. Poetry against frustration, by Gerald Jatzek and Manfred Chobot, Verlag Jugend & Volk, Vienna 1989, 
 Ich denk, ich denk, was du nicht denkst. Anthology for children, Neuer Breitschopf Verlag, Vienna 1991, 
 Wenn ich zaubern könnte! Anthology for children, Neuer Breitschopf Verlag, Vienna 1993
 Schmäh ohne, aber echt, Wiener Satire und Humor aus 100 Jahren, by Gerald Jatzek and Manfred Chobot, Edition Mokka, Vienna 2011,

References

External links 
 
Official website
Mail Your Art
Autorenport Literaturlexikon
Biography (International Literature Festival Berlin)
Interview with Fevers of the Mind

21st-century Austrian poets
Austrian male poets
1956 births
Living people
21st-century male writers